Konstantin Alexander Wecker (born 1 June 1947, Munich) is a German singer-songwriter; he also works as a composer, author, and actor.

Life and work
Classically educated at the Wilhelmsgymnasium, Wecker got one of his first jobs as a songwriter at Munich's cabaret "Münchner Lach- und Schießgesellschaft" in 1973. His breakthrough as a singer came in 1977 with the record Genug ist nicht genug ("Enough Is Not Enough"), which includes the popular talking blues "Willy," about a presumably close friend of Wecker's who was slain by drunken Nazis.

Wecker has released more than forty albums, and has also composed music for film, theater, and children's musicals.

In 2003, Wecker became a public opponent of the Iraq War, joining his leftist Liedermacher colleagues Hannes Wader and Reinhard Mey.

In March 2006, Wecker was forced to cancel a scheduled performance in the small town of Halberstadt, Saxony-Anhalt. This came after the far-right National Democratic Party (NPD) pressured local authorities and threatened to forcibly disrupt the concert. Wecker pledged to return to Halberstadt in the summer of 2006, and eventually performed in Halberstadt on 17 June 2006, accompanied by fellow singer-songwriter Hannes Wader and Afghan percussionist Hakim Ludin.

Selected works

Albums
 1972: Die sadopoetischen Gesänge des Konstantin Amadeus Wecker (later renamed as: Konstantin's Erste)
 1974: Ich lebe immer am Strand
 1977: Genug ist nicht genug
 1978: Eine ganze Menge Leben
 1979: Live
 1980: Liederbuch
 1981: Live in München
 1982: Das macht mir Mut
 1984: Inwendig warm
 1987: Wieder dahoam – Live in Austria
 1989: Stilles Glück, trautes Heim
 1993: Uferlos
 1996: Gamsig
 1998: Brecht
 2001: Vaterland
 2005: Am Flußufer
 2006: Politische Lieder
 2007: Alles das und mehr (DVD music video)
 2011: Wut und Zärtlichkeit
 2012: Wut und Zärtlichkeit (live)
 2015: Ohne Warum
 2017: Poesie und Widerstand
 2018: Sage Nein! Antifaschistische Lieder 1978 bis heute

Collaborations
 1988: Joan Baez / Konstantin Wecker / Mercedes Sosa: Three worlds, three voices, one vision
 1999: Jutta Richter / Konstantin Wecker: Es lebte ein Kind auf den Bäumen // book and CD
 2001: Konstantin Wecker / Hannes Wader: Was für eine Nacht
 2003: Reinhard Mey / Hannes Wader / Konstantin Wecker: Das Konzert
 2010: Konstantin Wecker / Hannes Wader: Kein Ende in Sicht

Filmography
 Mein ganzes Herz ist voll Musik, West Germany 1959, Musikfilm (Mitwirkung und Soloauftritt im Rudolf Lamy Kinderchor)
 Die Autozentauren, West Germany 1972, TV film (Darsteller)
 Love in 3-D, West Germany 1973, 93 min., Sexfilm, (as Rudi)
 The East Frisian Report, Der Ostfriesen-Report: O mei, haben die Ostfriesen Riesen, West Germany, 1973, 80 min., Komödie / Sexfilm (as Hinnerk)
 Unterm Dirndl wird gejodelt, West Germany 1973, Sexfilm (as Florian)
 Geilermanns Töchter – Wenn Mädchen mündig werden, West Germany 1973, Sexfilm (as Stefan)
 Liebesmarkt – Matratzen-Horchdienst, West Germany 1973, Sexfilm (as Tom)
 Beim Jodeln juckt die Lederhose, West Germany 1974, Sexfilm (as Sepp)
 Sisters, or the Balance of Happiness, West Germany 1979, 95 min., Frauenfilm / Drama (as Robert Edelschneider)
 Die Weiße Rose, West Germany, 1982, 123 min., Politthriller / Biografie
 , West Germany 1983, 110 min., Drama / Jugendfilm (as Schreiner Lustig)
 Sag nein, West Germany 1983, 98 min., documentary (Konzertausschnitt)
 Ende der Freiheit, West Germany 1983, 85 min., documentary (Konzertausschnitt)
 , West Germany 1984, 92 min., Komödie (as Straßenmusikant)
 Atemnot, Austria 1983 / 84, 95 min., Drama (Konzertauftritt mit Sigi Maron und Konstantin)
 Martha Dubronski, Switzerland 1984, 96 min., Literaturverfilmung / Drama (as Fleischhauer)
 Stinkwut, West Germany 1986, TV film (Sänger Titellied mit Zither)
 Kir Royal, West Germany 1986, TV series (as Studiomusiker, 6. episode)
 Spaltprozesse, West Germany 1987, documentary (Konzertausschnitt mit Konstantin Wecker)
 Dreifacher Rittberger, West Germany 1987, TV series (as Klavierträger, 4. episode)
 Der Geisterwald – Blutbuche und Rabenrache, West Germany 1988, TV series (as Rabe)
 Deutsche Redensarten und ihr Ursprung – Jemandem einen Korb geben, Germany 1989, TV short (as Spielmann)
 Die Republikaner, Germany 1990, documentary (Konzertausschnitt)
 Tatort – Blue Lady, Germany 1990 (as Rainer Seifert)
 Go Trabi Go, Deutschland, 1991, Filmkomödie (as Playboy)
 , Germany 1992, 92 min., Komödie (as Barpianist)
 Lilien in der Bank, Germany 1992, 104 min. (as Turnlehrer)
 Das Babylon Komplott, Austria 1993, TV film (as Thomas)
 1945, Austria 1994, TV film (as Bauer Mühlberger)
 : Dr. Schwarz und Dr. Martin, Germany 1994 / 1996, TV series in 8 episodes (as Franzl Unterrainer)
 Für mich soll's rote Rosen regnen, Germany 1995, documentary about Hildegard Knef (Gesprächsausschnitt mit K. Wecker)
 Kriminaltango, Germany 1995, TV series (as Mischa König, episode 6 „Münchner Freiheit")
 SOKO 5113: Tommy, Germany 1999, episode of the TV series (as Manfred Brunnhorst)
 , Germany 1999, TV film (as Bildhauer Gerd)
 , Germany 1999, TV film (as Herr Rinser)
 Ein lasterhaftes Pärchen, Germany 2000, TV film (as Frank)
 Alles mit Besteck, Germany 2001, short (as Pianist)
 Edelweiß, Austria 2000 (as Paul Richter)
 In der Mitte eines Lebens, Germany 2003, TV miniseries (as Tom Hochreiter)
 Apollonia, Germany 2005, TV film (as Müller Vinz)
 Grave Decisions, Germany 2006
 , Germany 2011

References

External links

 German Homepage of Konstantin Wecker
 A Website about Konstantin Wecker in English, including translations of some of his songs
 
 more about the Halberstadt ongoing

1947 births
Living people
People educated at the Wilhelmsgymnasium (Munich)
Musicians from Munich
German male musicians
German songwriters
German singer-songwriters
German socialists